Fiscella is a surname of Italian origin. Notable people with the surname include:

Andrew Fiscella (born 1966), American actor
Nicole Fiscella (born 1979), American actress and model

References

Italian-language surnames